Dunlop Island is a rocky island,  long, lying just off the Wilson Piedmont Glacier and the coast of Victoria Land, close northeast of Cape Dunlop. It was first mapped by the British Antarctic Expedition, 1907–09, under Ernest Shackleton, who named it for H.J.L. Dunlop, chief engineer of the ship Nimrod.

Important Bird Area
A 168 ha site comprising the whole island has been designated an Important Bird Area (IBA) by BirdLife International because it supports a breeding colony of south polar skuas, with some 88 breeding pairs reported in 1982.

See also 
 List of antarctic and sub-antarctic islands

References

External links 

Important Bird Areas of Antarctica
Seabird colonies
Islands of Victoria Land
Scott Coast